Kowala  is a village in the administrative district of Gmina Sitkówka-Nowiny, within Kielce County, Świętokrzyskie Voivodeship, in south-central Poland.

The village has a population of 936.

People 
 Tadeusz Wojda (b. 1957), Roman Catholic bishop

References

Kowala